Deh-e Torkan or Deh Torkan may refer to:

Deh-e Torkan, Chaharmahal and Bakhtiari
Deh Torkan, Kerman
Deh-e Torkan, Lorestan